The Presidio Texas Port of Entry is an international border crossing between Presidio, Texas in the United States and Ojinaga, Chihuahua in Mexico. It is located at the Presidio–Ojinaga International Bridge, connecting U.S. Route 67 to the north with Mexican Federal Highway 16 to the south. The original, privately-owned wooden bridge was built in the early 1900s, and the port of entry was established by executive order in 1917.  The bridge was most recently replaced in 1985.  The current border inspection station was completed about two years later.

There is also an old wooden railroad bridge at this location, but it has been closed since 2008 due to fire damage. , there are plans to repair the old rail bridge and to add an additional two lanes to the current vehicle bridge, but no timeline has been established for either project.

See also
 List of Canada–United States border crossings
 List of Mexico–United States border crossings

References

Mexico–United States border crossings
U.S. Route 67
1917 establishments in Texas
Transportation in Presidio County, Texas
Buildings and structures in Presidio County, Texas